Petchsamarn Sor.Samarngarment is a Thai Muay Thai fighter.

Career
Petchsamarn debuted his career in Bangkok under the name Newsaenchai Pakornphonsurin. At the end of 2017, following a series of losses he went back to compete in the provinces, at this occasion he changed his ring name to Petchsamarn Sor.Samarngarment. He went on an extended win streak throughout 2018 that led him to be picked up by the Kiatpetch promotion back in Bangkok.

On July 17, 2019, Petchsamarn stopped Chokdee PK.Saenchaimuaythaigym on cuts at Lumpinee Stadium.

On October 8, 2019, Petchsamarn defeated two weight Lumpinee Stadium champion Kompetch Sitsarawatsuer by decision. The following month he defeated three weight Lumpinee Stadium Champion Ronachai Tor.Ramintra by decision, taking his win streak to nineteen in a row and cementing his position as an elite fighter in the 122 lbs division.

Petchsamarn's undefeated streak came to an end when he was defeated by decision in a fight against Prajanchai P.K.Saenchaimuaythaigym on December 6, 2019  They rematched with the vacant Lumpinee Stadium 122 lbs title at stake. Petchsamarn lost the fight by decision again.

Following his title fight defeat Petchsamarn lost five fights in a row. He was defeated by decision against Chailar Por.Lakboon, Kompetch Sitsarawatsuer and Saoek Sitchefboontham. His losing streak reached its lowest point when he was stopped by Boonlong Petchyindee in the second round on October 9, 2020, at Rangsit Stadium for the Muaymanwansuk promotion.

Back to competition after a nine-month break due to the COVID-19 pandemic, Petchsamarn faced Petchmaeprik Fordpayakdaennua for the vacant Channel 7 Stadium 122 lbs title on December 12, 2021. He won the fight by decision. Petchsamarn failed to protect his title on May 22, 2022, when he was defeated by Parnthep V.K.Khaoyai. They rematched in a non-title fight on January 7, 2023, at the World Siam Stadium. Petchsamarn won the bout by decision.

On March 12, 2023 Petchsamarn faced Decho Por.Borirak at the Channel 7 Stadium. He won the fight by unanimous decision.

Titles and accomplishments
Channel 7 Boxing Stadium
 2021 Channel 7 122 lbs Champion

Fight record

|-  style="background:#cfc;"
| 2023-03-12 || Win ||align=left| Decho Por.Borirak || Channel 7 Stadium || Bangkok, Thailand ||Decision || 5 ||3:00  

|-  style="background:#cfc;"
| 2023-01-07 || Win ||align=left| Parnthep V.K.Khaoyai || Chang MuayThai Kiatpetch Amarin Super Fight, World Siam Stadium|| Bangkok, Thailand || Decision||  5||  3:00

|-  style="background:#cfc;"
| 2022-11-19 || Win ||align=left| Petchsansaeb Sor.Jor Tongprachin || Lumpinee Muay Thai TKO, Tawanna Bangkapi|| Bangkok, Thailand || Decision||  5||  3:00

|-  style="background:#fbb;"
| 2022-05-08 || Loss ||align=left| Parnthep V.K.Khaoyai || Channel 7 Stadium || Bangkok, Thailand ||Decision || 5 ||3:00  
|-
! style=background:white colspan=9 |

|-  style="background:#cfc;"
| 2022-02-15 || Win ||align=left| Phet Sawansangmanja || Lumpinee Stadium|| Bangkok, Thailand || Decision||  5||  3:00

|-  style="background:#cfc;"
| 2021-12-12 || Win ||align=left| Petchmaeprik Fordpayakdaennua || Channel 7 Stadium|| Bangkok, Thailand || Decision||  5||  3:00
|-
! style=background:white colspan=9 |
|-  style="background:#cfc;"
| 2021-03-14 || Win ||align=left| Ekwayu Mor.Krungthepthonburi || Chang Muay Thai Kiatpetch, Jitmuangnon Stadium|| Nonthaburi, Thailand || Decision||  5||  3:00

|-  style="background:#fbb;"
| 2020-11-24 || Loss ||align=left| Phet Sawansangmanja || Kiatpetch, Lumpinee Stadium|| Bangkok, Thailand || Decision||  5||  3:00

|-  style="background:#fbb;"
| 2020-10-09 || Loss ||align=left| Boonlong Petchyindee || Muaymanwansuk, Rangsit Stadium|| Bangkok, Thailand || TKO (middle kick/arm injury)|| 2||

|-  style="background:#fbb;"
| 2020-08-29|| Loss ||align=left| Kompetch Sitsarawatsuer || Kiatpetch, OrTorGor.3 Stadium || Nonthaburi, Thailand|| Decision ||5  || 3:00

|-  style="background:#fbb;"
| 2020-07-27|| Loss ||align=left| Saoek Sitchefboontham || ChefBoontham, Thanakorn Stadium || Nakhon Pathom province, Thailand || Decision || 5 || 3:00

|-  style="background:#fbb;"
| 2020-03-06|| Loss ||align=left| Chailar Por.Lakboon || Kiatpetch, Lumpinee Stadium || Bangkok, Thailand || Decision || 5 || 3:00

|-  style="background:#fbb;"
| 2020-02-11|| Loss ||align=left| Prajanchai P.K.Saenchaimuaythaigym || P.K.Saenchai, Lumpinee Stadium || Bangkok, Thailand || Decision || 5 || 3:00 
|-
! style=background:white colspan=9 |

|-  style="background:#cfc;"
| 2020-01-14 || Win ||align=left| Puenkon Diamond98 || Kiatpetch, Lumpinee Stadium || Bangkok, Thailand || Decision || 5 || 3:00

|-  style="background:#fbb;"
| 2019-12-06|| Loss||align=left| Prajanchai P.K.Saenchaimuaythaigym || Kiatpetch, Lumpinee Stadium || Bangkok, Thailand || Decision || 5 || 3:00

|-  style="background:#cfc;"
| 2019-11-05 || Win ||align=left| Ronachai Tor.Ramintra || Kiatpetch, Lumpinee Stadium || Bangkok, Thailand || Decision || 5 || 3:00

|-  style="background:#cfc;"
| 2019-10-08 || Win ||align=left| Kompetch Sitsarawatsuer || Kiatpetch, Lumpinee Stadium || Bangkok, Thailand|| Decision || 5 || 3:00

|-  style="background:#cfc;"
| 2019-09-06 || Win ||align=left| Chayakorn Por Lakboon || Kiatpetch, Rajadamnern Stadium || Bangkok, Thailand|| Decision || 5 || 3:00

|- style="background:#cfc;"
| 2019-07-19|| Win || align="left" | Chokdee PK.Saenchaimuaythaigym || Muaymanwansuk + Kiatpetch, Lumpinee Stadium || Bangkok, Thailand|| TKO (Doctor Stop/Cut) ||3 ||

|-  style="background:#cfc;"
| 2019-06-16 || Win ||align=left| Ekwayu Mor.Krungthepthonburi || Chang Muay Thai Kiatpetch, Jitmuangnon Stadium|| Nonthaburi, Thailand || Decision||  5||  3:00

|-  style="background:#cfc;"
| 2019-05-25 || Win ||align=left| Kangkawdaeng Huarongnakaeng|| Lumpinee Muay Thai TKO, Lumpinee Stadium || Bangkok, Thailand || Decision||  5||  3:00

|-  style="background:#cfc;"
| 2019-03-16 || Win ||align=left| Saifon Rattanapanu|| Lumpinee Muay Thai TKO, Lumpinee Stadium || Bangkok, Thailand || Decision||  5||  3:00

|-  style="background:#cfc;"
| 2019-02-10 || Win ||align=left| Sri-Uthai Sor.Jor.Piek-U-Thai || Chang Muay Thai Kiatpetch, Jitmuangnon Stadium|| Nonthaburi, Thailand || TKO || 4||

|-  style="background:#cfc;"
| 2018-08-25 || Win ||align=left| Saenpetch Kiathongyot|| MAX MUAY THAI || Pattaya, Thailand || Decision||  3||  3:00

|-  style="background:#cfc;"
| 2017-12-11 || Win ||align=left| Yodphet Pangkonkrab|| || Surin province, Thailand || Decision||  5||  3:00

|-  style="background:#cfc;"
| 2017-11-17 || Win ||align=left| Mumum Or.Chanachai|| ||  Thailand || Decision||  5||  3:00

|-  style="background:#fbb;"
| 2017-08-18 || Loss ||align=left| Yimsiam Nakhonmueangdet|| Muaymanwansuk, Rangsit Stadium || Pathum Thani, Thailand || Decision||  5||  3:00

|-  style="background:#fbb;"
| 2017-07-14 || Loss ||align=left| Ektoranin Mor.Krungthepthonburi|| Muaymanwansuk, Rangsit Stadium || Pathum Thani, Thailand || KO|| 3||

|-  style="background:#cfc;"
| 2017-06-16 || Win ||align=left| Eakmongkol Nor.Anuwatgym|| Muaymanwansuk, Rangsit Stadium || Pathum Thani, Thailand || Decision||  5||  3:00

|-  style="background:#cfc;"
| 2017-05-26 || Win ||align=left| Chatpayak Saksatun|| Muaymanwansuk, Rangsit Stadium || Pathum Thani, Thailand || Decision||  5||  3:00

|-  style="background:#cfc;"
| 2017-04-07 || Win ||align=left| Saensak Sor.Boonyiam|| || Thailand || Decision||  5||  3:00

|-  style="background:#fbb;"
| 2017-03-10 || Loss ||align=left| Weeraponlek Wor.wanchai|| Muaymanwansuk, Rangsit Stadium || Pathum Thani, Thailand || KO|| 2||

|-  style="background:#cfc;"
| 2017-02-07 || Win ||align=left| Yodsuwit Wor.Pairanan|| || Thailand || KO|| 4||

|-  style="background:#cfc;"
| 2017-01-18 || Win ||align=left| Fahmai Sor.Monpichit|| Wan Kingthong, Rajadamnern Stadium|| Bangkok, Thailand || KO|| 3||

|-  style="background:#fbb;"
| 2016-12-25 || Loss ||align=left| Petchnakin Wor.Sungpraphai || Rajadamnern Stadium|| Bangkok, Thailand || Decision|| 5||3:00

|-  style="background:#fbb;"
| 2016-11-16 || Loss ||align=left| Khun Tor.Silapon || || Thailand || KO|| 4||

|-  style="background:#cfc;"
| 2016-09-16 || Win ||align=left| Khawim Sor.Sommai|| Muaymanwansuk, Rangsit Stadium || Pathum Thani, Thailand || Decision||  5||  3:00

|-  style="background:#cfc;"
| 2016-06-11 || Win ||align=left| Sita S.K.P.Muay Thai|| Muaymanwansuk, Rangsit Stadium || Pathum Thani, Thailand || Decision||  5||  3:00

|-  style="background:#cfc;"
| 2016-04-13 || Win ||align=left| Pitchaya Big M Gym || Wanmeechai, Rajadamnern Stadium|| Bangkok, Thailand || Decision|| 5||3:00 
|-
| colspan=9 | Legend:

References

Petchsamarn Sor.Samarngarment
Living people
1998 births